Judy Ellen Garber is the director of the Center for Cancer Genetics and Prevention at the Dana–Farber Cancer Institute and a professor of medicine at Harvard Medical School. Garber previously served as president of the American Association for Cancer Research.

Garber's research focuses on DNA damage in breast cancer.

Garber attended Yale School of Medicine, receiving her MD/MPH in 1981. She did her residency in internal medicine and fellowship in hematology at Brigham and Women's Hospital in Boston.

Garber has been the president of the Center for Cancer Genetics and Prevention at Dana-Farber since 2010.
In 2011–2012, Garber served as president of the American Association for Cancer Research. She is a member of the National Cancer Advisory Board and a co-scientific director of the Breast Cancer Research Foundation.

Awards 
 2001 Elected to the American Society for Clinical Investigation
 2008 Statesman Award, American Society for Clinical Oncology
 2013 Elected to the National Academy of Medicine.
 2013 Elected fellow of the AACR Academy
 2017 Margaret L. Kripke Legend Award, MD Anderson Cancer Center
 2017 AACR Joseph H. Burchenal Award for Outstanding Achievement in Clinical Cancer Research
 2018 Giants of Cancer Care, OncLive
 2019 ASCO - American Cancer Society Award and Lecture

References 

Harvard Medical School faculty
Yale School of Medicine alumni
Fellows of the AACR Academy
Living people
Year of birth missing (living people)
Members of the National Academy of Medicine